Anton Mackowiak (29 September 1922 – 22 December 2013) was a German wrestler. He competed in two events at the 1952 Summer Olympics.

References

1922 births
2013 deaths
German male sport wrestlers
Olympic wrestlers of Germany
Wrestlers at the 1952 Summer Olympics
Sportspeople from Dortmund